Barton Flats is a recreation area located in the San Bernardino National Forest near San Gorgonio Mountain. The nearest major town is Big Bear Lake, California.

A fire began at 3:52 p.m. Wednesday the 17th of June, 2015 behind Camp de Benneville Pines in the Jenks Lake area of Barton Flats. The cause is still unknown.

The flames traveled east and southeast, blackening heavily forested mountainsides that haven't burned in over a century.  The surrounding Mojave desert was filled with ash and smoke so thick, the Sun didn't break through for 3 days.

On the 10th day of the Barton Flats fire, 06-27-15, nature stepped in and helped the firefighter's put out this nine-day blaze, by raining on what was left of the remaining smoldering fire.

Barton Flats is the southern gateway to Big Bear Lake, California via highway 38 from the 10 freeway.

References

San Bernardino National Forest